Kanku Mulekelayi (born 1 April 1980) is a retired footballer from DR Congo.

He played for the Zambian national team in 1998 under the name Matthews Kamwashi.|

Mulekelayi was a member of the DR Congo squad for the 2000 and 2002 Africa Cup of Nations.

Now Coaching in his native country Congo DRC

Father to four kids Named Matthew Jr Mulekelayi
Kevin Mulekelayi, Johnathan Mulekelayi and the oldest Daughter, Ester Mulekelayi

International career

International goals
Scores and results list DR Congo's goal tally first.

References

External links

1980 births
Living people
People from Lubumbashi
Democratic Republic of the Congo footballers
Democratic Republic of the Congo expatriate footballers
Democratic Republic of the Congo international footballers
Zambian footballers
Zambia international footballers
Dual internationalists (football)
Democratic Republic of the Congo emigrants to Zambia
2000 African Cup of Nations players
2002 African Cup of Nations players
TP Mazembe players
Cape Town Spurs F.C. players
Expatriate soccer players in South Africa
Democratic Republic of the Congo expatriate sportspeople in South Africa
Association football midfielders